Thorofare is an unincorporated community located within West Deptford Township in Gloucester County, New Jersey, United States. The area is served as United States Postal Service ZIP Code 08086.

As of the 2000 United States Census, the population for ZIP Code Tabulation Area 08086 was 5,424.

Checkpoint Systems is headquartered in Thorofare.

Demographics

References

External links

Census 2000 Fact Sheet for Zip Code Tabulation Area 08086 from the United States Census Bureau

West Deptford Township, New Jersey
Unincorporated communities in Gloucester County, New Jersey
Unincorporated communities in New Jersey